A Central Criminal Court refers to major legal court responsible for trying crimes within a given jurisdiction. Such courts include:

The name by which the Crown Court is known when it sits in the City of London
Central Criminal Court of England and Wales, commonly known as the Old Bailey
Central Criminal Court, the name for the High Court of Ireland when it is hearing a criminal case
Central Criminal Court of Iraq

Courts by type